Maline pri Štrekljevcu is a small village north of Štrekljevec in the Municipality of Semič in Slovenia. The area is part of the historical region of Lower Carniola. The municipality is now included in the Southeast Slovenia Statistical Region.

Name
The name of the settlement was changed from Maline to Maline pri Štrekljevcu in 1955.

Cultural heritage
Particularly in the northern part of the village many late 19th-century and early 20th-century traditional village houses and outbuildings are preserved and have been included on the Slovenian Ministry of Culture's Registry of Immovable Cultural Heritage.

References

External links
Maline pri Štrekljevcu at Geopedia

Populated places in the Municipality of Semič